Mothers against decapentaplegic homolog 9 also known as SMAD9, SMAD8, and MADH6 is a protein that in humans is encoded by the SMAD9 gene.

SMAD9, as its name describes, is a homolog of the Drosophila gene: "Mothers against decapentaplegic". It belongs to the SMAD family of proteins, which belong to the  TGFβ superfamily of modulators. Like many other TGFβ family members, SMAD9 is involved in cell signalling. When a bone morphogenetic protein binds to a receptor (BMP type 1 receptor kinase) it causes SMAD9 to interact with SMAD anchor for receptor activation (SARA).The binding of ligands causes the phosphorylation of the SMAD9 protein and the dissociation from SARA and the association with SMAD4. It is subsequently transferred to the nucleus where it forms complexes with other proteins and acts as a transcription factor. SMAD9 is a receptor regulated SMAD (R-SMAD) and is activated by bone morphogenetic protein type 1 receptor kinase. There are two isoforms of the protein.  Confusingly, it is also sometimes referred to as SMAD8 in the literature.

Nomenclature 

The SMAD proteins are homologs of both the drosophila protein, mothers against decapentaplegic (MAD) and the C. elegans protein SMA. The name is a combination of the two. During Drosophila research, it was found that a mutation in the gene, MAD, in the mother, repressed the gene, decapentaplegic, in the embryo. The phrase "Mothers against" was added since mothers often form organizations opposing various issues e.g. Mothers Against Drunk Driving or (MADD); and based on a tradition of such unusual naming within the gene research community.

References 

Developmental genes and proteins
MH1 domain
MH2 domain
R-SMAD
Transcription factors
Human proteins